is a passenger railway station in the city of Asahi, Chiba Japan, operated by the East Japan Railway Company (JR East).

Lines

Station layout

Iioka Station consists of two opposed side platforms, connected by a footbridge. The station is staffed.

Platforms

History
Iioka Station opened on 1 June 1897. The station was absorbed into the JR East network upon the privatization of the Japanese National Railways (JNR) on 1 April 1987.

Passenger statistics
In fiscal 2019, the station was used by an average of 733 passengers daily (boarding passengers only).

Surrounding area
 
 Asahi City Marine Junior High School

See also
 List of railway stations in Japan

References

External links

 JR East station information 

Railway stations in Chiba Prefecture
Stations of East Japan Railway Company
Railway stations in Japan opened in 1897
Sōbu Main Line
Asahi, Chiba